Shaghur could refer to the following places:

Al-Shaghur, Damascus, a neighborhood in Damascus, Syria
Shaghur, Israel, a municipality incorporating the towns of Majd al-Krum, Deir al-Asad and Bi'ina in Israel between 2003 and 2008
Shaghur Valley, the Arabic name for the Beit HaKerem Valley in Galilee, Israel

See also
Shagur, a wind instrument